Maine School Administrative District 59 (MSAD 59) is an operating school district within Somerset County, Maine, covering the town of Madison.

Starks pulled out after the 2011–12 school year they are now with Regional School Unit 9 Mt Blue Regional School District in Farmington, and Athens and Brighton Plantion pulled out after the 2012–13 school year they are now part of AOS 94 District located in the Dexter, Maine area.

Madison (SAD 59) is currently proposing a Consolidation with SAD 74 in neighboring Anson, and SAD 53 located in the Pittsfield, Maine area. SAD 59 has proposed consolidations with both districts in different proposals voters rejected both. SAD 59 is also in the process of consolidating its school sports programs (Middle/Jr. High and High School) with SAD 74 and SAD 13 in the Bingham Area to save money, fuel and travel costs.

Athens voted to leave District 59 in May 2013.

References

External links

59
59